Sungai Durian, or "Durian River", also called Sei Durian is a village in the district of Banua Lawas, Tabalong Regency in the province of South Kalimantan, Indonesia.
The village had 837 inhabitants as of the 2010 census.

Notes

Sources

Populated places in South Kalimantan